Bush Hamdan (born February 10, 1986) is an American football coach who is currently the offensive coordinator and quarterbacks coach for the Boise State University Broncos.

Playing career 
Hamdan was a quarterback at Boise State from 2004 to 2008. Although he never started a game, he was praised for his ability to be a good teammate. He graduated from Boise State in 2008 with a degree in communications.

Coaching career 
After his playing career ended, he joined the coaching staff at Colorado in 2009 as a student assistant. He also had stints at Maryland, Sacramento State, and Florida before his first coordinator job.

He was named the co-offensive coordinator and quarterbacks coach at Arkansas State in 2013, reuniting with his offensive coordinator and position coach in college, Bryan Harsin. He was not one of the assistants brought over to Boise State when Harsin was named the head coach of the program in 2014, and instead accepted a position as the offensive coordinator and quarterbacks coach at Davidson College in 2014.

Hamdan joined the coaching staff at Washington in 2015 as a quality control coach before being promoted to wide receivers coach and passing game coordinator in 2016. He spent 2017 with the Atlanta Falcons as their quarterbacks coach before rejoining the coaching staff at Washington in 2018 as the Huskies offensive coordinator & quarterbacks coach. He was fired on December 22, 2019, hours after the team's victory in the Las Vegas Bowl.

Hamdan was named to Eliah Drinkwitz's coaching staff at Missouri in 2020.

Hamdan was hired as the OC of his alma mater Boise State's football team in December 2022.

Personal life 
Born in Kuwait City, Hamdan is of Palestinian descent and his mother was from Pakistan. He and his family lived in Kuwait and were on vacation in San Diego when Iraq invaded Kuwait in 1991. The Hamdans stayed in the United States and eventually settled in Gaithersburg, Maryland. Hamdan's brother Gibran was a seventh round draft selection in the 2003 NFL Draft and was a journeyman quarterback throughout his career.

References

External links 
 Missouri Tigers bio

1986 births
Living people
Sportspeople from Kuwait City
People from Gaithersburg, Maryland
Players of American football from Maryland
American football quarterbacks
Boise State Broncos football players
Colorado Buffaloes football coaches
Maryland Terrapins football coaches
Sacramento State Hornets football coaches
Florida Gators football coaches
Arkansas State Red Wolves football coaches
Davidson Wildcats football coaches
Washington Huskies football coaches
Atlanta Falcons coaches
Missouri Tigers football coaches